"Magic Music" is the sixth single from Japanese pop singer Kaela Kimura. Released as the first single from her third album, Scratch, on June 28, 2006, it reached number seven on the Japan Oricon singles chart.

Track listing 
"Magic Music"
"Hungry like the CHICKEN"
"Magic Music" (Instrumental)
"Hungry like the CHICKEN" (Instrumental)

References

2006 singles
Kaela Kimura songs
Japanese-language songs
Song articles with missing songwriters
2006 songs